Costur is a municipality in the comarca of Alcalatén, Castellón, Valencia, Spain.

References

Municipalities in the Province of Castellón
Alcalatén